A halbert is a two-handed pole weapon.

Halbert may also refer to:

People with the given name Halbert 
 Halbert E. Paine (1826–1905), lawyer, politician, and general in the Union Army during the American Civil War
 Halbert L. Dunn (1896–1975), American physician and biostatistician
 Halbert S. Greenleaf (1827–1906), member of the United States House of Representatives
 Halbert White (1950–2012), American economist
 Halbert Owen Woodward (1918–2000), American judge
 Halbert W. Brooks (1885–?), member of the Wisconsin State Assembly

People with the surname Halbert 
 Chick Halbert (1919–2013), American professional basketball player
 Clarence Halbert (1874–?), American lawyer and academic
 Fernand Halbert (20th century), Belgian athlete
 J. E. Halbert (1850–1892), American physician and politician
 James Nathaniel Halbert (1871–1948), Irish entomologist
 John Halbert (born 1937), Australian rules footballer
 Hugh Halbert (1910–1997), Australian politician
 Robert Henry Halbert (1870–1943), Canadian agrarian activist and politician
 Sherrill Halbert (1901–1991), American judge
 Thomas Halbert (c.1808–1865), English-born New Zealand whaler, trader and founding father

See also
 Halbert Township, Martin County, Indiana
 Hal (disambiguation)